Narcissus asturiensis, the pygmy daffodil, is a perennial bulbous plant native to the mountains of North Portugal and Spain, where it  grows at altitudes  up to 2000 m (6000 ft). , Kew sources consider the correct name to be Narcissus cuneiflorus.

This dwarf Narcissus is 7–12 cm (2.5– 5 in) tall and has small yellow flowers growing singly.

This is a threatened species in the wild, but it is amenable to cultivation.
It can be grown as a cold hardy garden plant, needing vernalization (a period of cold weather) in order to flower. As a garden plant, it will bloom in late January or early February at low altitudes.

This plant contains a number of alkaloids including hemanthamine, hemanthidine,  tazettine and epimacronine.

Further images

References

asturiensis
Plants described in 1933